Terry Dolan may refer to:

 Terry Dolan (footballer) (born 1950), English former footballer and current manager
 Terry Dolan (activist) (1950–1986), American Republican Party political operative
 Terry Dolan (boxer), English middleweight boxer of the 1940s and 1950s
 Terence Dolan, Irish lexicographer
 Terry Dolan (musician), American musician
 Terry Dolan, founder and owner of Dolan Bikes